A non-binding referendum on loaning a moai to France was held in Easter Island on 1 March 2010. Voters were asked whether they agreed with the Mare Nostrum Foundation displaying a moai in Paris, which had first been proposed in 2008. The loan was rejected by 89% of voters. As a result, on 14 April 2010 the Consejo de Monumentos Nacionales decided that the moai would not be sent to France.

Results

References

Moai referendum
Easter Island moai referendum
Easter
Referendums in Easter Island